The 1896 Cleveland Spiders season was a season in American baseball. The team finished with an 80–48 record and a second-place finish in the National League. After the season they played the first-place Baltimore Orioles in the Temple Cup series. The same two teams had met the previous season, with the second-place Spiders beating the first-place Orioles 4 games to 1, but this year the results were reversed, as the Spiders were swept in four straight.

Regular season

Season standings

Record vs. opponents

Roster

Player stats

Batting

Starters by position 
Note: Pos = Position; G = Games played; AB = At bats; H = Hits; Avg. = Batting average; HR = Home runs; RBI = Runs batted in

Other batters 
Note: G = Games played; AB = At bats; H = Hits; Avg. = Batting average; HR = Home runs; RBI = Runs batted in

Pitching

Starting pitchers 
Note: G = Games pitched; IP = Innings pitched; W = Wins; L = Losses; ERA = Earned run average; SO = Strikeouts

Relief pitchers 
Note: G = Games pitched; W = Wins; L = Losses; SV = Saves; ERA = Earned run average; SO = Strikeouts

References 

Cleveland Spiders seasons
Cleveland Spiders season
Cleveland Spiders